Thomas Bernard Rehder II (born January 27, 1965) is a former American football offensive lineman who played three seasons in the National Football League (NFL) with the New England Patriots and New York Giants. He was drafted by the New England Patriots in the third round of the 1988 NFL Draft. He played college football at the University of Notre Dame and attended St. Joseph High School in Santa Maria, California. Rehder was also a member of the Sacramento Surge of the World League of American Football. He was a member of the New York Giants team that won Super Bowl XXV.

References

External links
Just Sports Stats
College stats
Fanbase profile

Living people
1965 births
Players of American football from Sacramento, California
American football offensive linemen
Notre Dame Fighting Irish football players
New England Patriots players
New York Giants players
Sacramento Surge players